Osgyth (or Osyth; died  700 AD) was an English saint. She is primarily commemorated in the village of Saint Osyth, Essex, near Colchester. Alternative spellings of her name include Sythe, Othith and Ositha. Born of a noble family, she founded a priory near Chich which was later named after her.

Life
Born in Quarrendon, Buckinghamshire (at that time part of Mercia), she was the daughter of Frithuwald, a sub-king of Mercia in Surrey. Her mother was Wilburh, of the royal house of Mercia. Her parents, with St. Erconwald, founded Chertsey Abbey in 675 AD.

Raised in the care of her maternal aunts, St Edith of Aylesbury and Edburga of Bicester, her ambition was to become an abbess, but she was too important as a political pawn to be set aside. She was forced by her father into a dynastic marriage with Sighere, King of Essex. She is likely the mother of Offa of Essex, although this is not certain.

While her husband was off on a long hunt to run down a beautiful white stag, Osgyth persuaded two local bishops to accept her vows as a nun. Upon his return some days later, he reluctantly agreed to her decision and granted her some land at Chich near Colchester where she established a convent, and ruled as first abbess. She was beheaded by some raiding pirates, perhaps because she may have resisted being carried off.

Legends
One day, St. Edith sent Osgyth to deliver a book to St. Modwenna of Northumbria at her nunnery. To get there, Osgyth had to cross a stream by a bridge. The stream swollen, the wind high, she fell into the water and drowned. Her absence was not noted for two days. Edith thought she was safe with Modwenna who was not expecting her visit. On the third day, Edith, wondering that her pupil had not returned, went to Modwenna. The abbesses were greatly concerned when they discovered Osgyth was apparently lost. They searched for her and found the child lying near the banks of the stream. The abbesses prayed for her restoration, and commanded her to arise from the water and come to them. This she did. A similar tale is found in Irish hagiography.

Her later death was accounted a martyrdom by some, but Bede makes no mention of Saint Osgyth. The 13th-century chronicler Matthew Paris repeats some of the legend that had accrued around her name. The site of her martyrdom became transferred to the holy spring at Quarrendon. The holy spring at Quarrendon, mentioned in the time of Osgyth's aunts, now became associated with her legend, in which Osgyth stood up after her execution, picking up her head like Saint Denis in Paris, and other cephalophoric martyrs and walking with it in her hands, to the door of a local convent, before collapsing there. Some modern authors link the legends of cephalophores miraculously walking with their heads in their hands to the Celtic cult of heads.

Veneration
Her cult was promoted by Maurice, bishop of London, where there was a shrine dedicated to her at St. Paul's Cathedral.

Around 1121, his successor, Richard de Belmeis I founded a priory for canons of Saint Augustine, on the site of a former nunnery at Chich. He obtained the relic of an arm for the monastery church. His remains were buried in the chancel of the church in 1127: he bequeathed the church and tithes to the canons, who elected as their first abbot or prior William de Corbeil, afterwards Archbishop of Canterbury (died in 1136). Corbeil acquired the other arm for Canterbury.

Benefactions, charters, and privileges granted by Henry II, made the Canons wealthy: at the Dissolution of the monasteries in 1536, priory revenues were valued at £758 5s. 8d. yearly. In 1397 the abbot of St Osgyth was granted the right to wear a mitre and give the solemn benediction, and, more singularly, the right to ordain priests, conferred by Pope Boniface IX. The gatehouse (illustrated), the so-called 'Abbot's Tower' and some ranges of buildings remain.

Osgyth's burial site at St. Mary the Virgin, Aylesbury became a site of great, though unauthorized pilgrimage; following a papal decree in 1500, the bones were removed from the church and buried in secret. Undeterred, according to the curious  17th-century antiquary John Aubrey (author of the Brief Lives), "in those days, when they went to bed they did rake up the fire, and make a X on the ashes, and pray to God and Saint Sythe (Saint Osgyth) to deliver them from fire, and from water, and from all misadventure." A house in Aylesbury is still called St Osyth's in her honour.

Her feast day is 7 October. She is normally depicted carrying her own head.

References

Further reading
Oxford Dictionary of National Biography
Biographical Dictionary of Dark Age Britain.
Geoffrey of Burton's life of Modwenna includes material on Osgyth.

Bailey, "Osyth, Frithuwold and Aylesbury" in Records of Buckinghamshire 31 (1989)
Hohler, "St Osyth and Aylesbury", Records of Buckinghamshire 18.1 (1966).

External links
 
St. Osyth, Essex: Official Site: "About St. Osyth" has some historical detail
Picturesque England: St. Osyth's priory, with details of her legend (text)

700 deaths
Anglo-Saxon nuns
Anglo-Saxon royal consorts
Mercian saints
East Saxon saints
People from Aylesbury
7th-century Christian martyrs
Cephalophores
Year of birth unknown
Executed people from Buckinghamshire
Christian female saints of the Middle Ages
Christian royal saints
7th-century English nuns